The sixth season of the American television series Whose Line Is It Anyway? premiered on ABC on June 24, 2004, and concluded on September 4, 2004.

Cast

Recurring 
 Chip Esten (five episodes)
 Greg Proops (three episodes)
 Brad Sherwood (one episode)
 Denny Siegel (one episode)

Episodes 

"Winner(s)" of each episode as chosen by host Drew Carey are highlighted in italics. The winner would take his or her seat and call a sketch for Drew to perform (often with the help of the rest).

References

External links
Whose Line Is It Anyway? (U.S.) (a Titles & Air Dates Guide)
Mark's guide to Whose Line is it Anyway? - Episode Guide

Whose Line Is It Anyway?
2004 American television seasons